CSS Stonewall Jackson was a cotton-clad  sidewheel ram of the Confederate Navy during the American Civil War.
 
Stonewall Jackson was selected in January 1862, by Capt. James E. Montgomery to be part of his River Defense Fleet at New Orleans. On 25 January Montgomery began to convert her into a cottonclad ram by placing a  oak sheath with  iron covering on her bow, and by installing double pine bulkheads fitted with compressed cotton bales.

Service history
Stonewall Jacksons conversion was completed on 16 March 1862. Under Capt. G. M. Phillips she was detached from Montgomery's main force and sent to Forts Jackson and St. Philip on the lower Mississippi to cooperate in the Confederate defense of New Orleans. There, with five other vessels of Montgomery's fleet, all under Capt. J. A. Stevenson, she joined the force under Capt. J. K. Mitchell, CSN, commanding Confederate naval forces in the lower Mississippi.

On 24 April 1862 a Union fleet under Flag Officer David Farragut, USN, ran past Forts Jackson and St. Philip on its way to capture New Orleans. With Varunas shot glancing off her bow, Stonewall Jackson backed off for another blow and struck again in the same place, crushing Varunas side. The shock of the blow turned the Confederate vessel, and she received five 8-inch shells from Varuna, abaft her armor. Varuna ran aground in a sinking condition, and Stonewall Jackson, chased by  coming to Varunas rescue, was driven ashore and burned.

See also 
 Bibliography of early American naval history
 , a French-built ironclad that became the CSS Stonewall

References

External links
Battles and Leaders of the Civil War: Being for the Most Part ..., Volume 2 1887 .p.54 drawing of the "Stonewall Jackson"
 Naval Historical Center Online Library of Selected Images: CSS Stonewall Jackson

Cottonclad rams of the Confederate States Navy
Shipwrecks of the American Civil War
Maritime incidents in April 1862